For the Summer Olympics, there are 120 venues that have been or will be used for football. This is the most of any sport at the Olympics.

Cities in bold are Olympic host cities.

Notes

References

Venues

Football